Great West End Theatres is a documentary series detailing the history, architecture and theatrical anecdotes of the 40 West End Theatres of London (as covered by the monthly Society of London Theatre list), released individually as All-Region DVDs and also as digital downloads and the first 10 episodes were broadcast from 3 August 2013 in the UK by the BSkyB digital satellite channel Sky Arts 2 and were chosen as "Pick of the Day" by the London edition of Time Out magazine.

Production 
Presented by Sir Donald Sinden and described by The Stage newspaper as "Promises to be the most definitive guide to Theatreland", it features many of the West End's star actors, actresses and practitioners discussing the theatres that they are associated with, such as Anthony Andrews, Steven Berkoff, Simon Callow, Charles Dance, Roy Hudd, Gillian Lynne, Sir Cameron Mackintosh, Sir Ian McKellen, Martin Shaw and Samuel West.

Directed and narrated by Marc Sinden, written and researched by Shaun McKenna, it is produced by Jo Gilbert for Great Productions.

Episodes
The first ten episodes released in the series are (and feature interviews with): 
 Theatre Royal, Haymarket: (Sir Ian McKellen, Steven Berkoff & Martin Shaw).
 Prince of Wales: (Sir Cameron Mackintosh, Simon Callow, Roy Hudd & Griff Rhys Jones).
 Piccadilly: (Steven Berkoff, Simon Callow, Gillian Lynne, Martin Shaw & Samuel West).
 Wyndham's: (Sir Cameron Mackintosh, Anthony Andrews, Steven Berkoff, Charles Dance, Gillian Lynne, Martin Shaw & Samuel West). 
 St Martins: (Sir Cameron Mackintosh, Sir Ian McKellen, Stephen Waley-Cohen, Anthony Andrews, Steven Berkoff, Charles Dance & Martin Shaw).
 Ambassadors: (Sir Ian McKellen, Sir Stephen Waley-Cohen, Anthony Andrews, Steven Berkoff, Simon Callow, Charles Dance, Martin Shaw & Samuel West). 
 Her Majesty's: (Anthony Andrews, Michael Ball, Steven Berkoff, Simon Callow, Griff Rhys Jones, Gillian Lynne, Martin Shaw & Samuel West).
 Palace: (Sir Cameron Mackintosh, Anthony Andrews, Michael Ball, Steven Berkoff & Simon Callow).
 Noël Coward: (Sir Cameron Mackintosh, Sir Ian McKellen, Anthony Andrews, Steven Berkoff, Simon Callow, Griff Rhys Jones, Martin Shaw & Samuel West).
 Theatre Royal, Drury Lane: (Sir Cameron Mackintosh, Sir Ian McKellen, Anthony Andrews, Michael Ball, Steven Berkoff, Simon Callow, Roy Hudd, Griff Rhys Jones, Gillian Lynne & Martin Shaw).

Full List of Theatres covered
Adelphi • Aldwych • Ambassadors • Apollo • Apollo Victoria • Cambridge • Coliseum • Criterion • Dominion • Duchess • Duke of York’s • Fortune • Garrick • Gielgud • Harold Pinter • Her Majesty’s • London Palladium • Lyceum • Lyric • Noël Coward • Novello • Old Vic • Palace • Piccadilly • Phoenix • Playhouse • Prince Edward • Prince of Wales • Queen’s • Royal Court • Royal Opera House • Savoy • Shaftesbury • St Martins • Theatre Royal, Drury Lane • Theatre Royal, Haymarket • Trafalgar Studios • Vaudeville • Victoria Palace • Wyndham’s

Reception 
In their review of the series, the British Theatre Guide said "This film is as close as one can get to standing on the stage taking an ovation. This series is beautifully filmed and gets the balance exactly right between classy camera work, history, reminiscence and gossip."

The Daily Telegraph, in its review, stated the "lovely documentary series is made by the director Marc Sinden. Its star, and – it transpires – the best documentary frontman of all time, is his actor-father: Sir Donald Sinden, 90 years old next month. Sir Donald has been let loose, offering anecdotes and memories apparently as they occur to him and the effect is enchanting beyond belief. It is also, at times, incredibly funny. One has the sense of a lifetime spent in this world, being poured out for our delight like glasses of vintage champagne. Great West End Theatres is financed privately, in order that artistic control can be maintained and this shows in every loving, angle-free moment. More money is now in the process of being raised from investors. It seems to me rather important that the series should be completed: this is popular history at its best."

References

External links
Official website

Documentary films about theatre
Documentary television series about architecture
Direct-to-video documentary films
Theatre in London